Francois Verstraeten (23 March 1887 – 28 August 1965) was a Belgian racing cyclist. He won the Belgian national road race title in 1907 and 1908.

References

External links
 

1887 births
1965 deaths
Belgian male cyclists
People from Etterbeek
Cyclists from Brussels